Allanche is a commune in the Cantal department in the Auvergne region of south-central France.

The inhabitants of the commune are known as Allanchois or Allanchoises

Geography
Allanche is located some 70 km south of Clermont-Ferrand and 20 km east by southeast of Massiac. It can be accessed by the D679 from Marcenat in the northwest to the village then south to Sainte-Anastasie. The D39 comes from Pradiers in the north through the village then south to Chalinargues. The D9 road branches off the D3 to the west of the commune and passes through the village continuing to the northeast. Apart from the village there are a number of hamlets. These are:
Chastre
Chavanon
Coudour
Feydit
Le Bac Bas
Le Bac Haut
Les Cites
Maillargues
Roche Haut
Romaniargues

The commune is largely farmland with patches of forest and the edge of a large forest in the east.

The Allanche river flows from the northwest through the village and continues southeast to feed the Alagnon river. Many tributaries feed the Allanche in the commune including the Ruisseau de Laneyrat, the Ruisseau de Coudoun, the Ruisseau de Chavanon, the Ruisseau de Vernois, and other unnamed streams.

Heraldry

Administration
List of Successive Mayors

Mayors from 1941

Population

Culture and heritage

Civil heritage
The former Château de Mercoeur (15th century) is registered as an historical monument.
At Allanche station from May to September there is the Vélorail Cézallier for tourists.
In the south-west of the commune are the Pinatelle Allanche mountains.

Religious heritage
The commune has two religious buildings and structures that are registered as historical monuments:
The Church of Saint-Julien-de-Chanet (12th century). The church contains several items that are registered as historical objects:
The main Altar and Retable (17th century)
A Statue: Virgin and child (15th century)
A Group Sculpture: Virgin of Pity (16th century)
A Painting: the Adoration of the Magi (16th century)
Bas-reliefs (16th century)
The Church of Saint John the Baptist (12th century). The church contains several items that are registered as historical objects:
A Sculpture: Ecce homo (15th century)
An Eagle Lectern (17th century)
A Bronze Bell (1671)
A set of Pews (16th century)
A Reliquary-Monstrance (15th century)
A Processional Cross (15th century)

Other religious sites of interest
The Presbytery contains a Reliquary (15th century) that is registered as an historical object.
The Church of Chanet contains a Processional Cross (15th century) which is registered as an historical object.

Church of Saint John the Baptist Picture Gallery

Notable people linked to the commune
Charles Ganilh (1758-1836), economist, was born in Allanche.

See also
Communes of the Cantal department
Cantons of the Cantal department
Arrondissements of the Cantal department

Bibliography
Our Auvergne ancestors, the Auvergne migration to Brittany, Serge Duigou, Éditions Ressac, Quimper, 2004. [On the Cézallier migratory movement to Brittany in the 18th and 19th centuries which included Allanche together with Albaret, Chabrier, Laymet, Mainhes, etc..]

References

External links
Allanche on the old National Geographic Institute website 
Allanche on Géoportail, National Geographic Institute (IGN) website 
Allanche on the 1750 Cassini Map

Communes of Cantal